The Evolve World Tour (stylized as ƎVOLVE World Tour) was the third concert tour by American pop rock band Imagine Dragons in support of their third studio album Evolve (2017). The tour began on September 26, 2017 in Phoenix, Arizona and concluded on November 18, 2018, in Mexico City.

Background 
Imagine Dragons conducted two previous tours, their Night Visions Tour and Smoke + Mirrors Tour, supporting their first two albums, released in 2012 and 2015. Following the release of two singles, "Believer" and "Thunder" in early 2017, the band released their third studio album, Evolve, in June 2017. In May, the band had announced the Evolve Tour in support of the album. On September 18, 2017 they announced 23 further dates, extending the tour to Europe. The Tour began on September 26, 2017. K. Flay was the opening act for their first US tour leg and their UK and Europe shows. In December, the band announced six shows in Australia and New Zealand. Singer-songwriter Grace VanderWaal was the opening act in the tour's 2018 summer leg in North America.

Set list
{{Hidden
| headercss = background: #CECEF2; font-size: 100%; width: 100%;  
| contentcss = text-align: left; font-size: 100%; width: 95%; 
| header = North America Leg 1
| content =
This set list is from the concert on September 26, 2017, in Phoenix.

"I Don't Know Why"
"It's Time"
"Gold"
"Whatever It Takes"
"I'll Make It Up to You"
"Mouth of the River"
"Demons"
"Yesterday"
"Start Over"
"Rise Up"
"Dancing in the Dark"
"Second Chances"
"It Comes Back to You"
"Bleeding Out"
"Dream"
"Thunder"
"On Top of the World"
"I Bet My Life"
"Radioactive"
Encore
"Believer"
"Walking the Wire"

}}

{{Hidden
| headercss = background: #CECEF2; font-size: 100%; width: 100%;  
| contentcss = text-align: left; font-size: 100%; width: 95%; 
| header = Europe Leg 1
| content =
This set list is from the concert on February 24, 2018, in Birmingham.

"I Don't Know Why"
"It's Time"
"Gold"
"Whatever It Takes"
"I'll Make It Up to You"
"Mouth of the River"
"Yesterday"
"Start Over"
"Demons"
"Rise Up"
"On Top of the World"
"I Bet My Life"
"It Comes Back to You"
"Warriors" / "Bleeding Out"
"Thunder" (with K.Flay)
"Believer"
Encore
"Walking the Wire"
"The Fall"
"Radioactive"

}}

{{Hidden
| headercss = background: #CECEF2; font-size: 100%; width: 100%;  
| contentcss = text-align: left; font-size: 100%; width: 95%; 
| header = North America Leg 2
| content =
This set list is from the concert on July 30, 2018, in Wichita.

"Radioactive"
"It's Time"
"Whatever It Takes"
"Yesterday"
"Natural"
"Walking the Wire"
"Next to Me"
"Shots"
"Every Breath You Take" (The Police cover)
"I'll Make It Up to You"
"Start Over"
"Rise Up"
"I Don't Know Why"
"Mouth of the River"
"Born to Be Yours"
"Amsterdam"
"I Bet My Life"
Encore
"Demons"
"Thunder"
"On Top of the World"
"Believer"

}}

Tour dates

Cancelled shows

Notes

References 

Imagine Dragons concert tours
2017 concert tours
2018 concert tours